Hadi Al Masri (born 7 June 1986) is a Syrian footballer who plays for Al-Wathba and Syria national football team.

Career
Al Masri played for Al-Wahda prior having a short spell with Bahrain SC. Later on, he returned to Al-Wahda, before moving to Al Ahli SC. In August 2018, he joined Al-Wehdat.

Al Masri was called to play for Syria at the age of 30.

References

External links

1986 births
Living people
Syrian footballers
Association football defenders
Syria international footballers
Place of birth missing (living people)
Al-Wahda SC (Syria) players
Bahrain SC players
Taliya SC players
Al Ahli SC (Doha) players
Al-Wehdat SC players
Qatar Stars League players
Syrian expatriate sportspeople in Jordan
Expatriate footballers in Jordan
Expatriate footballers in Qatar
Syrian expatriate sportspeople in Qatar
Syrian Premier League players